James Finn (1806–1872) was a British Consul in Jerusalem, in the then Ottoman Empire (1846–1863). He arrived in 1845 with his wife Elizabeth Anne Finn. Finn was a devout Christian, who belonged to the London Society for Promoting Christianity Amongst the Jews, but who did not engage in missionary work during his years in Jerusalem.

Finn was a writer and philanthropist. He was a great believer in productivity, an ideology that was very much in vogue at the time, and in 1853 purchased for £250 Karm al-Khalil (Arabic for "Abraham's Vineyard", lit. "vineyard of the loved one", which in Hebrew became Kerem Avraham) a barren piece of land outside the walls of the Old City. Kerem Avraham was established as a training farm for Jews in agriculture and to become productive citizens. Finn employed Jewish labourers to build the first house there in 1855. Cisterns for water storage were built and a soap factory was established which produced high quality soap sold to tourists.

He helped establish an experimental farm, initially meant for the poverty-stricken Jews from Jerusalem, at the village of Artas outside Bethlehem.

Finn was removed from his post in 1863. His superiors believed he had become too personally involved in local affairs. His insolvency and clashes with Samuel Gobat, the Protestant Bishop of Jerusalem, also contributed to his removal.

Books (partial list)

By James Finn
In chronological order of the first publication.
The Jews in China, London: Wertheim, 1843. -University of Hong Kong Libraries, Digital Initiatives, China Through Western Eyes
 Byeways in Palestine, London 1868, 482pp.
Byeways in Palestine, Adamant Media, Boston, 2002 reprint of the London 1868 original. 482pp. 
The Orphan Colony of Jews in China. Containing a letter received from themselves, with the latest information concerning them. London: James Nisbet, 1872.
 Stirring Times: Or Records from Jerusalem Consular Chronicles of 1853 to 1856., Edited by Elizabeth Anne Finn. vol. 1. London 1878. The full text, archive.org, Original: Harvard. Can download PDF.
alternative: the full text, archive.org, original: University of Michigan. Can download PDF.
 Stirring Times: Or Records from Jerusalem Consular Chronicles of 1853 to 1856., Edited by Elizabeth Anne Finn. vol. 2. London 1878. The full text, archive.org, Original: Harvard. Can download PDF.
alternative: the full text, archive.org, original: University of Michigan. Can download PDF.

By Elizabeth Anne McCaul Finn
A Home in the Holy Land. A tale illustrating customs and incidents in modern Jerusalem. Adamant Media, Boston, 2002 reprint of the London 1866 original. 
A Third Year in Jerusalem. A tale illustrating customs and incidents of modern Jerusalem; or, a sequel to "Home in the Holy Land". Adamant Media, Boston, 2002 reprint of the London 1869 original.

See also
Saint George Interfaith shrine
Motza, History
Kerem Avraham
Bayt 'Itab

References

External links

 
Byeways in Palestine, at the Project Gutenberg
 

Zionism
Land of Israel
Consuls-General of the United Kingdom to Jerusalem
1806 births
1872 deaths